The Pacific Southwest Building (also known as the Security Bank Building) is a 15-story,  high-rise completed in 1925 in downtown Fresno, California.
Original construction took eighteen months and cost for the headquarters for the Fidelity Branch of the Pacific-Southwest Trust and Savings Bank. Originally, a beacon on top of the tower served as a frost warning to farmers within a 30-mile radius.

Fresno banker William Sutherland was instrumental in the planning and construction of the building. In 1925, the Pacific Southwest Trust and Savings Bank, with Sutherland as its president, moved its offices there.

The building is currently owned by Beverly Hills-based developers, Sevak, Hrayr and Serko Khatchadourian. The top floors of the building have been converted into apartments, and have in recent years increased occupancy in the building from 5% to 95%.

References

External links
 

Buildings and structures completed in 1925
Buildings and structures in Fresno, California
Skyscraper office buildings in California
Residential skyscrapers in California
Skyscrapers in Fresno, California